Los Alamos Public Schools is a school district based in Los Alamos, NM, USA.
Los Alamos Public Schools serves all of Los Alamos County, including the communities of Los Alamos and White Rock. The district also has a portion in Sandoval County.

The school district has a total of seven schools, five in Los Alamos, two in White Rock. The district has five elementary schools, one middle school, and one high school.

Schools

High schools
 Topper Freshman Academy
 Los Alamos High School

Middle schools

Los Alamos Middle School is the only middle school for the Los Alamos Public School District.

The school was originally founded as Cumbres Junior High School in 1962, the town's second junior high school after the (now defunct) Pueblo Junior High School. When district enrollment declined heavily in 1984 the school board decided to close a junior high to save money. The district chose to keep the newer school, Cumbres, open and closed Pueblo in the summer of 1986. The school district wanted to make a clean break from the past and named the amalgamated school simply "Los Alamos Middle School". To address the difficulty of merging the former rival sports teams, the Pueblo Braves and the Cumbres Cougars, the school held an election for a new name, choosing "Hawks".

Facilities
In 2012, construction began on the middle school to replace aging buildings.  The original 100 and 500 wings, which held eighth grade and seventh grade classes respectively, were torn down to make way for a new two-story building.  The new building was completed in the summer of 2013 and opened in time for the 2013-2014 academic year.

Elementary schools
 Aspen Elementary
 Barranca Elementary
 Chamisa Elementary
 Mountain Elementary
 Pinon Elementary

References

School districts in New Mexico
Education in Sandoval County, New Mexico
Education in Los Alamos County, New Mexico
School districts established in 1943
1943 establishments in New Mexico